The 2010 Men's World Floorball Championships were the eighth men's Floorball World Championships. The tournament was held from 4 December to 11 December 2010 in the cities of Helsinki, and Vantaa, Finland.

This was the first world championships under the International Floorball Federation's (IFF) FIFA-like continental qualification system. A total of 32 countries had registered for this event, which is the most nations to ever register for an IFF-sanctioned world championship event. The previous record was 29 for the 2008 Men's World Floorball Championships.

Qualifying

Under the IFF's new qualification system, the 32 countries registered for the world championships had to qualify for only 16 spots. 8 of these spots had already been pre-determined, with the top 7 teams from the 2008 Men's World Floorball Championships A-Division and the top team from the B-Division automatically qualifying. This left just 8 spots for the other 24 registered countries.

The countries already qualified are as follows:

Asia/Oceania

Qualifying in the Asia/Oceanian region for the world championships will be overseen by the Asia Oceania Floorball Confederation (AOFC).

Only 3 out of 5 registered AOFC countries qualified. The 5 countries were as follows:

Note: India withdrew from world championships due to financial difficulties

Europe
Only 4 out of 16 countries registered in Europe qualified. The 16 countries were as follows:

North America
Only 1 out of 2 countries registered in North America qualified. The 2 countries were as follows:

Groups
Ballots for the groups in this event were drawn on May 9, 2009, during one of the semi-final matches of the 2009 Men's under-19 World Floorball Championships in Turku, Finland.

In the way the ballots were drawn, no team qualified from the AOFC played against each other in group stage matches, and no team qualified from Europe either.

The groups were assembled based on qualifying as follows:

Final groups

Championship schedule

Preliminary round

Group A

Group B

Group C

Group D

Playoff round

Quarter finals

Semi-finals

Bronze medal game

Gold medal game

Placement round

13–16

9–12

15th place match

13th place match

11th place match

9th place match

5–8

5th place match

3rd place match

See also
2010 Men's Asia Pacific Floorball Championships
2010 Men's World Floorball Championships Qualifying

References

External links
 Official website

Floorball World Championships
Mens World Floorball Championships, 2010
Floorball
2010 in Finnish sport
International sports competitions in Helsinki
December 2010 sports events in Europe
2010s in Helsinki
Sport in Vantaa